Yemi Mary John (born 3 May 2003) is a British track and field athlete. She won the gold medal in the 400 metres at the 2022 World Athletics Under-20 Championships.

Career
Yemi Mary John ran a new personal best to finish runner up in the 400 metres at the 2021 European Under-20 Championships in Tallinn.

She was a member of the British 4 × 400 m relay team that finished fifth at the 2022 World Indoor Championships held in Belgrade.

John was crowned the winner at the 2022 World U20 Championship 400 m event in Cali, Colombia as she lowered her personal best throughout the rounds to win the final in 51.50 seconds, the second fastest time ever recorded by a British under-20 athlete, after Linsey MacDonald's 51.16 s from 1980. She later also won bronze in the 4x400 m relay race at the event.

Personal life
John has an Italian father and lives in London. She was set to join the University of Michigan as a sophomore in 2023, but signed for the University of Southern California.

References

External links

 2003 births
Living people
British female sprinters
21st-century British women
World Athletics U20 Championships winners